Conseiller d'État ("councillor of state") may refer to:
 Conseiller d'État (France), a high-level government official of administrative law in the Council of State of France
 Conseiller d'Etat, the title of the members of a Conseil d'État (Switzerland), the cantonal government of French-speaking Swiss cantons

See also 
 State councillor (disambiguation)
 Conseil d'État (disambiguation)
 State Council (disambiguation)
 Council of State